In mathematics, a reciprocity law is a generalization of the law of quadratic reciprocity to arbitrary monic irreducible polynomials  with integer coefficients. Recall that first reciprocity law, quadratic reciprocity, determines when an irreducible polynomial  splits into linear terms when reduced mod . That is, it determines for which prime numbers the relationholds. For a general reciprocity lawpg 3, it is defined as the rule determining which primes  the polynomial  splits into linear factors, denoted .

There are several different ways to express reciprocity laws. The early reciprocity laws found in the 19th century were usually expressed in terms of a power residue symbol (p/q) generalizing the quadratic reciprocity symbol,  that describes when a prime number is an nth power residue modulo another prime, and gave a relation between (p/q) and (q/p).  Hilbert reformulated the reciprocity laws as saying that a product over p of Hilbert norm residue symbols (a,b/p), taking values in roots of unity, is equal to 1. Artin reformulated the reciprocity laws  as a statement that the Artin symbol from ideals (or ideles) to elements of a Galois group is trivial on a certain subgroup. Several more recent generalizations express reciprocity laws using cohomology of groups or representations of adelic groups or algebraic K-groups, and their relationship with the original quadratic reciprocity law can be hard to see.

Quadratic reciprocity

In terms of the Legendre symbol, the law of quadratic reciprocity for positive odd primes states

Cubic reciprocity

The law of cubic reciprocity for Eisenstein integers states that if  α and β are  primary (primes congruent to 2 mod 3) then

Quartic reciprocity

In terms of the quartic residue symbol, the law of quartic reciprocity for Gaussian integers states that if π and θ are primary (congruent to 1 mod (1+i)3)  Gaussian primes then

Octic reciprocity

Eisenstein reciprocity

Suppose that ζ is an th root of unity for some odd prime . 
The power character is the power of ζ such that

for any prime ideal  of Z[ζ]. It is extended to other ideals by multiplicativity.
The Eisenstein reciprocity law states that 

Kummer reciprocity
Suppose that  ζ is an lth root of unity for some odd regular prime l. Since l is regular, we can extend the symbol {} to ideals in a unique way such that
 where n is some integer prime to l such that pn is principal. 
The Kummer reciprocity law states that 

for p and q any distinct prime ideals of Z[ζ] other than (1–ζ).

Hilbert reciprocity

In terms of the Hilbert symbol, Hilbert's reciprocity law for an algebraic number field states that
 
where the product is over all finite and infinite places.
Over the rational numbers this is equivalent to the law of quadratic reciprocity. To see this take a and b to be distinct odd primes. 
Then Hilbert's law becomes 

But (p,q)p is equal to the Legendre symbol, (p,q)∞ is 1 if one of p and q is positive and –1 otherwise, and (p,q)2 is (–1)(p–1)(q–1)/4. So for p and q positive odd primes Hilbert's law is the law of quadratic reciprocity.

Artin reciprocity

In the language of ideles, the Artin reciprocity law for a finite extension L/K states that the Artin map from the idele class group CK to the abelianization Gal(L/K)ab of the Galois group vanishes on NL/K(CL), and induces an isomorphism
 

Although it is not immediately obvious, the Artin reciprocity law easily implies all the previously discovered reciprocity laws, by applying it to  suitable extensions L/K. 
For example, in the special case when K contains the nth roots of unity and L=K[a1/n] is a Kummer extension of K, the fact that the Artin map vanishes on NL/K(CL) implies Hilbert's reciprocity law for the Hilbert symbol.

Local reciprocity
Hasse introduced a local analogue of the Artin reciprocity law, called the local reciprocity law. One form of it states that for a finite abelian extension of L/K of local fields, the Artin map is an isomorphism 
from  onto the Galois group .

Explicit reciprocity laws

In order to get a classical style reciprocity law from the Hilbert reciprocity law Π(a,b)p=1, one needs to know the values of (a,b)p for p dividing n. Explicit formulas for this are sometimes called explicit reciprocity laws.

Power reciprocity laws

A power reciprocity law may be formulated as an analogue of the law of quadratic reciprocity in terms of the Hilbert symbols as

Rational reciprocity laws

A rational reciprocity law is one stated in terms of rational integers without the use of roots of unity.

Scholz's reciprocity law

Shimura reciprocity

Weil reciprocity law

Langlands reciprocity

The Langlands program includes several  conjectures for general reductive algebraic groups, which for the special of the group GL1 imply the Artin reciprocity law.

Yamamoto's reciprocity law

Yamamoto's reciprocity law is a reciprocity law related to class numbers of quadratic number fields.

See also
Hilbert's ninth problem
Stanley's reciprocity theorem

References

 

. Correction, ibid. 80 (1973), 281.

Survey articles 

 Reciprocity laws and Galois representations: recent breakthroughs

Algebraic number theory